The Pool of the 2003 Fed Cup Asia/Oceania Zone Group II composed of four teams competing in a round robin competition. The top two teams qualified for Group I next year.

India vs. Philippines

Pacific Oceania vs. Kyrgyzstan

India vs. Kyrgyzstan

Pacific Oceania vs. Philippines

Pacific Oceania vs. India

Philippines vs. Kyrgyzstan

  and  advanced to Group I for next year, where they respectively placed third and eighth overall. Philippines was thus relegated down to Group II for 2005.

See also
Fed Cup structure

References

External links
 Fed Cup website

2003 Fed Cup Asia/Oceania Zone